Ronald Lorne Stackhouse (born August 26, 1949) is a Canadian former professional ice hockey defenceman.

Playing career
Stackhouse was born in Haliburton, Ontario. He started his career playing with the Peterborough Petes under Roger Neilson in the OHA. Stackhouse was drafted 18th overall by the Oakland Seals in the 1969 NHL Amateur Draft. He lasted only a few seasons with the Seals, before being traded to the Detroit Red Wings in 1971.

Stackhouse's career did not pick up until he joined the Pittsburgh Penguins early in 1974. He tied an NHL record the next season with 6 assists in a game by a defenceman, and riled off seasons of 60 and 71 points. Stackhouse played with the Penguins until 1982, when he retired from hockey and returned to live in Haliburton, where he taught at Haliburton Highlands Secondary School.

Awards
Named to the OHA Second All-Star Team (1969)
Played in the NHL All-Star Game (1980)

Records
Tied NHL record with 4 assists in one period (March 1975)
Tied NHL record with 6 assists by a defenseman in one game (March 1975)

Career statistics

Regular season and playoffs

External links
 

1949 births
California Golden Seals players
Detroit Red Wings players
Ice hockey people from Ontario
Living people
Oakland Seals draft picks
People from Haliburton County
Peterborough Petes (ice hockey) players
Pittsburgh Penguins players
Providence Reds players
Canadian ice hockey defencemen